Robert Duff (July 21, 1868 – October 11, 1928) was a merchant and politician in Newfoundland. He represented Carbonear in the Newfoundland House of Assembly from 1924 to 1928.

Biography 
Born in Carbonear on July 21, 1868, Duff became a prominent business owner in the area. Duff was president of William Duff & Sons Ltd., the Public Service Electric Co., the Harbour Grace Marine Railway Dock Co. and the Conception Bay Mutual Marine Co. He was also a director of the Newfoundland Savings Bank.

Duff was elected to the Newfoundland assembly in 1924 as a Liberal-Progressive. In 1926, he transferred his support to the government of Walter Stanley Monroe and was made a minister without portfolio in the cabinet.

He married Louisa C. Penney in 1896 and they had four children.

He died in Montreal on October 11, 1928.

References 

1868 births
1928 deaths
Members of the Newfoundland and Labrador House of Assembly
Government ministers of the Dominion of Newfoundland